The R264 road is a regional road in Ireland, located in County Donegal in Ulster. It runs between Raphoe and Lifford. The road passes through the village of Ballindrait, where it crosses over the Burn Dale.

References

Regional roads in the Republic of Ireland
Roads in County Donegal